Oleg Golikov  (born 21 October 1968, Chesma, Chelyabinsk Oblast) is a Russian political figure and a deputy of the 8th State Duma.

From 1996 to 1998, Golikov worked at the administration of the Kalininsky district in Chelyabinsk. In 2012–2019, he was the deputy director of the All-Russian Scientific Research Institute Of Technical Physics. From 2005 to 2021, he was the deputy of the Legislative Assembly of Chelyabinsk Oblast. In September 2021, he was elected to the 8th State Duma from the Rostov Oblast constituency.

He is one of the members of the State Duma the United States Treasury sanctioned on 24 March 2022 in response to the 2022 Russian invasion of Ukraine.

References

1968 births
Living people
United Russia politicians
21st-century Russian politicians
Eighth convocation members of the State Duma (Russian Federation)
Russian individuals subject to the U.S. Department of the Treasury sanctions